The BBC Sessions is a live compilation album of the British progressive rock band Electric Light Orchestra.  The sessions were recorded at the BBC's Langham 1 studio and later broadcast on BBC program In session with Bob Harris. The dates they were recorded/transmitted are:
 11 January 1973 / 27 January 1973 (tracks 1-2) 
 25 April 1973 / 30 April 1973 (tracks 3-5) 
 13 February 1974 / 11 March 1974 (tracks 6-10)

The album features two early lineups of ELO:

Lineup One (Tracks 1-5)
 Jeff Lynne - Guitar & Vocals
 Bev Bevan - Drums
 Richard Tandy - Keyboards
 Mike de Albuquerque - Bass & Vocals
 Wilf Gibson - Violin
 Mike Edwards - Cello
 Colin Walker - Cello
Lineup Two (Tracks 6-10)
 Jeff Lynne - Guitar & Vocals
 Bev Bevan - Drums
 Richard Tandy - Keyboards
 Mike de Albuquerque - Bass & Vocals
 Mik Kaminski - Violin
 Mike Edwards - Cello
 Hugh McDowell - Cello

Track listing

References

BBC Radio recordings
Electric Light Orchestra live albums
Electric Light Orchestra compilation albums
1999 live albums
1999 compilation albums